Bauhinia acuminata is a species of flowering shrub native to tropical southeastern Asia. Common names include dwarf white bauhinia, white orchid-tree and snowy orchid-tree. The exact native range is obscure due to extensive cultivation, but probably from Malaysia, Indonesia (Java, Borneo, Kalimantan, Lesser Sunda Islands), and the Philippines.

It grows two to three meters tall. The flowers are fragrant,  in diameter, with five white petals, ten yellow-tipped stamens and a green stigma. The species occurs in deciduous forests and scrub.

It is widely cultivated throughout the tropics as an ornamental plant. It may be found as an escape from cultivation in some areas, and has become naturalised on the Cape York Peninsula, Australia.

The plant has a number of ethnobotanical uses around the world. The roots are used by the Javanese to treat cough and cold and in India the leaves and bark are used to treat asthma. It is also used in many culinary dishes of Odisha

Gallery

References

acuminata
Flora of Malesia
Garden plants of Asia
Shrubs
Plants described in 1753
Taxa named by Carl Linnaeus
Fabales of Asia